Jacques Delécluse (15 September 1933 – 29 October 2015) was a French percussionist and composer born in Béthune.

Delécluse was known as the "Master of the Percussion Étude" for his 12 Etudes for Snare Drum released in 1964. These études have become commonplace in the orchestral percussion repertoire.

Discography
 Quintuple, with works by Nguyễn Thiên Đạo and Marius Constant

References

External Link 

 Delécluse: Étude 1 for Snare Drum performed by Rob Knopper

French composers
French male composers
French percussionists
1933 births
2015 deaths
People from Béthune